Jamui railway station, station code JMU, serves the headquarters of Jamui district in the Indian state of Bihar. It is one of the major railway stations  in Danapur division of East Central Railway. Jamui is connected to metropolitan areas of India, by the Delhi–Kolkata main line via Mugalsarai–Patna route which runs along the historic  Grand Trunk Road.

Railways and roads are the main means of transport in the Jamui region. Jamui railway station is in Howrah–Patna–Mughalsarai main line. Most of the Patna, Barauni-bound express trains coming from Howrah, Sealdah, Ranchi, Tatanagar  stop here.

Facilities 
The major facilities available are waiting rooms, computerized reservation facility, reservation counter, vehicle parking. The vehicles are allowed to enter the station premises. The station also has STD/ISD/PCO telephone booth, toilets, tea stall and book stall.

There are two platforms here, which are average in condition

Trains 

Many passenger and express trains serve Jamui Junction.

Nearest airports
The nearest airports to Jamui Station are:
Birsa Munda Airport, Ranchi  
Gaya Airport 
Lok Nayak Jayaprakash Airport, Patna 
Netaji Subhash Chandra Bose International Airport, Kolkata

References

External links 
 Jamui Junction Map
 Official website of the Jamui district

Jamui
Railway stations in Jamui district
Danapur railway division